Chester J. Crandell (June 19, 1946 – August 4, 2014) was an American politician and a Republican member of the Arizona Senate representing District 6 since January 14, 2013. Crandell served consecutively in the Arizona State Legislature from January 10, 2011, until January 14, 2013, in the Arizona House of Representatives District 5 seat.

Crandell, a fifth-generation rural Arizonan and rancher, had served in the Legislature since 2011.

Education
Crandell was born in Holbrook, Arizona in 1946, and earned his BS in agricultural education from University of Arizona and his MEd in from Northern Arizona University.

Elections
 2012 Redistricted to District 6, and with incumbent Republican Senator Lori Klein redistricted to District 1, Crandell was unopposed for the Senate District 6 August 28, 2012 Republican Primary, winning with 17,089 votes; and won the November 6, 2012 General election with 45,105 votes against Democratic Representative Tom Chabin.
 2010 With House District 5 incumbent Democratic Representative retiring and Republican Representative Bill Konopnicki running for Arizona Senate and leaving both seats open, Crandell ran in the three-way August 24, 2010 Republican Primary and placed second with 9,975 votes; in the four-way November 2, 2010 General election, fellow Republican nominee Brenda Barton took the first seat and Crandell took the second seat with 30,890 votes ahead of Democratic nominees Bill Shumway and Prescott Winslow.

Sponsored legislation
In 2014, Crandell sponsored SB1093, which would have required federal law enforcement and other agencies doing business in an Arizona county to register with and present a warrant to the county sheriff. The proposed bill also stipulated that half of all fines imposed by the federal government must be turned over to Arizona's general fund. The bill was rejected by the Senate Rules Committee, which voted 4–2 against it after its attorney said that it would likely violate the Constitution.  The American Conservative Union gave him an evaluation of 92%.

Death
He was found dead August 4, 2014, after failing to return from a horseback ride near Heber-Overgaard. He was 68. According to the Navajo County Sheriff's Office, Crandell had left for a one-hour ride at about 10 A.M. on what investigators were told was a new colt. When he did not return, family members searched the area where he was riding, and, at about 2 P.M, found him dead. The horse was found in the area. After an autopsy, the cause of death was determined to be injuries from being thrown from his horse.

References

External links
 Official page at the Arizona State Legislature
 Campaign site
 

1946 births
2014 deaths
Accidental deaths in Arizona
Republican Party Arizona state senators
Deaths by horse-riding accident in the United States
Republican Party members of the Arizona House of Representatives
People from Holbrook, Arizona
University of Arizona alumni
Northern Arizona University alumni
Ranchers from Arizona